Eric Carruthers (born 2 February 1953 in Edinburgh) is a Scottish former footballer who played most notably for Heart of Midlothian.

Carruthers began his professional career for Hearts in 1970 and played more than fifty league matches between 1970 and 1975.

Carruthers was in 1975 sold by Hearts to English team Derby County for £25,000. His stay at Derby County was largely unsuccessful as he managed only one appearance as a substitute in two seasons. He eventually was released on a free transfer in October 1977.

In 1979, he played twenty matches for Australian National Soccer League team A.P.I.A. Leichhardt.

References

1953 births
Living people
Expatriate soccer players in Australia
Scottish footballers
Scottish expatriate footballers
National Soccer League (Australia) players
Scottish Football League players
English Football League players
Heart of Midlothian F.C. players
Derby County F.C. players
West Adelaide SC players
APIA Leichhardt FC players
Association football forwards
Scottish expatriate sportspeople in Australia